Robert Ian Fulford (born 1969) is a leading English croquet player who has dominated the sport since the turn of the 1990s.

Life and career
Born in Colchester, England, he was educated at Colchester Royal Grammar School and Durham University followed by the University of Essex.

Fulford also coaches croquet, particularly in Australia and the Chattooga Club in North Carolina. Robert has made  croquet videos with Australian croquet expert Kevin Brereton in which Robert teaches both basic and advanced break tactics. He has won the world championship 5 times:
1990 at Hurlingham Club, England
1992 in Newport, USA
1994 at Carden Park, Cheshire, England
1997 at Moorabinda Croquet Club, Bunbury, Western Australia
2002 in Wellington, New Zealand

Fulford has also won the President's Cup twelve times (1989, 1998, 1999, 2001, 2002, 2006, 2008, 2009, 2010, 2011, 2012 and 2018), the Open Championship eleven times (1991, 1992, 1996, 1998, 2003, 2004, 2006, 2007, 2008, 2014 and 2015) and the Men's Championship four times (1990, 1998, 2006, 2011).

Career statistics

Major tournament performance timeline

The 1989 and 2001 World and Open Championships were combined events.

Major championship finals: 40 (25 titles, 15 runners-up)

Style
Fulford's playing style includes the ability to play a range of shots. His tactic of peeling an opponent's ball through hoop 1 makes a triple peel as hard as possible for the opponent. His sextuple peels are also more frequent than those of any other player. Robert Fulford uses an Irish grip [rather like a golf grip] and employs "casting" [swinging mallet over the ball] about three times before each shot. He has strong wrists which makes the Irish grip work for him without it causing the R.S.I. that the grip is sometimes blamed for. In fact, Robert admits that he has quite a wrist-dominated technique which contradicts most coaching manuals that advise minimal wrist involvement.

World Championship results
Fulford has played in the following World Championships:
1989: Round 4: (lost to John Prince +26tp, -17, -26tp)
1990: won (beat Mark Saurin +26, +24tp)
1991: S/F (lost to John Walters -14otp, -26tp)
1992: won (beat John Walters -5tp, +4tp, +12tp)
1994: won (beat Chris Clarke -12tpo, +12tp, +18tp, +13)
1995: runner-up (lost to Chris Clarke -18tp, +12tpo, -26tp, +26tp, -26)
1997: won (beat Stephen Mulliner +17, -3tpo, +9otp, +11otp)
2001: runner-up (lost to Reg Bamford +16tp, -17sxp, +3, -26sxp, -26qp)
2002: won (beat Toby Garrison +26tp, +26tp, -17tp, +15tp)
2005: runner-up (lost to Reg Bamford -17tp, -26sxp, -17sxp)
2008: S/F (lost to Chris Clarke +26tp, +26tp, -11tpo, -17, -26)
2009: Round 3: (lost to Ben Rothman -14, -15tp, -17)
2012: Round 3: (lost to Marcus Evans +26tp, -20tp, +26sxp, -3tp, -25qnp)
2013: Round 3: (lost to Andrew Johnston +17tp, +12tp, -26, -15, -15)

References

External links
 The Croquet Records site

1969 births
Living people
English croquet players
Alumni of the University of Essex
People educated at Colchester Royal Grammar School
Alumni of St Aidan's College, Durham
Sportspeople from Colchester